Klysman Lucas Lopes Silva (born 15 June 1990 in Rio de Janeiro), aka Lucas Klysman is a Brazilian footballer who plays for FC United Zürich, as forward.

Career
Lucas made his Portuguese Liga debut 8 December 2008 as substitute in the 78 minute against Leixões, at Estádio D. Afonso Henriques.

From the season 2009–10 he is loaned out to gain experience at Serzedelo in the Terceira Divisão.

External links 
 
 Lucas Klysman at ZeroZero
 

1990 births
Living people
Brazilian footballers
Brazilian expatriate footballers
Primeira Liga players
Vitória S.C. players
G.D. Serzedelo players
Associação Naval 1º de Maio players
Juventude Sport Clube players
Vilaverdense F.C. players
F.C. Oliveira do Hospital players
SC Vianense players
Lusitano FCV players
GS Loures players
S.C.U. Torreense players
Association football forwards
Brazilian expatriate sportspeople in Portugal
Brazilian expatriate sportspeople in Switzerland
Expatriate footballers in Portugal
Expatriate footballers in Switzerland
Footballers from Rio de Janeiro (city)